"Ignorance is bliss" is a phrase coined by Thomas Gray in his 1768 "Ode on a Distant Prospect of Eton College". The sentiment was already expressed by Publilius Syrus: In nil sapiendo vita iucundissima est ("In knowing nothing, life is most delightful").

Ignorance Is Bliss may also refer to:

Music
 Ignorance Is Bliss (Face to Face album), a 1999 album by Face to Face
 Ignorance Is Bliss (Skepta album), a 2019 album by Skepta
 "Ignorance Is Bliss" (Tiddas song), a 1996 song by Tiddas
 "Ignorance Is Bliss", a song by punk rock band Ramones, from their Brain Drain (album) (1989)
 "Ignorance Is Bliss", a song by San Francisco '90s rock band Jellyfish, from the compilation album Nintendo: White Knuckle Scorin' (1991)
 "Ignorance Is Bliss", a song by American rock band Living Colour, from their Stain (album) (1992)
 "Ignorance Is Bliss", a song by Swedish death metal band Defleshed, from their album Reclaim the Beat (2005)
 "Ignorance Is Bliss", a song by hip hop artist Kendrick Lamar, from his album Overly Dedicated (2010)
 "Ignorance Is Bliss", a song by the American metalcore band Beartooth, from their album Disgusting (2014)
 "Ignorance Is Bliss", a song by hip hop artist Reks from his album REBELutionary (2012)

Other uses
 Ignorance Is Bliss (film), a 2017 Italian film directed by Massimiliano Bruno
 Ignorance Is Bliss (House), a 2009 episode of House
 Alice: Ignorance Is Bliss, a short 2014 documentary following the relationship between an 84-year-old woman diagnosed with dementia and her grandson
 "Ignorance Is Bliss", a famous line said by the character Cypher from the movie The Matrix (1999)
 Ignorance Is Bliss, a BBC radio adaptation of the American comedy quiz It Pays to Be Ignorant, which ran on the Light Programme from 1946 until 1950

See also
 Ignorance (disambiguation)
 Bliss (disambiguation)
 Blissful ignorance effect
 "Ignorance is strength", a phrase used in the novel Nineteen Eighty-Four